Andraž Žinič (born 12 February 1999) is a Slovenian footballer who plays for Maribor as a right-back.

Club career
Žinič made his Slovenian PrvaLiga debut for Domžale on 23 February 2020 in a game against Mura.

On 29 July 2022, he signed a three-year contract with Maribor.

References

External links
 
 Andraž Žinič at NZS 

1999 births
Living people
Slovenian footballers
Slovenia youth international footballers
Slovenia under-21 international footballers
Association football fullbacks
NK Domžale players
NK Dob players
NK Maribor players
Slovenian Second League players
Slovenian PrvaLiga players